Jalaladdunya Fariburz II was the 23rd Shirvanshah.

Reign
Information about his reign does not exist. However coins minted on his name was found along with name of Caliph al-Nasir. Inscriptions on coins mentions his name as "al-Malik al-Adil Jalal-ad Dunya wal-Din Fariburz b. Afridun b. Manuchehr, Shirvanshah". These sumptuous titles gives hint that Shirvanshah was independent during Seljuq-Eldiguzid wars. He reigned after his uncle Shirvanshah Shahanshah, until 1204. He was succeeded by another uncle Shirvanshah Farrukhzad I. His issues are not mentioned anywhere.

Ancestors

References

1204 deaths
Year of birth unknown
13th-century Iranian people